In mathematical finite group theory, a quadratic pair for the odd prime p, introduced by , is a finite group G together with a quadratic module, a faithful representation M on a vector space over the finite field with p elements such that G is generated by elements with minimal polynomial (x − 1)2. Thompson classified the quadratic pairs for p ≥ 5.  classified the quadratic pairs for p = 3. With a few exceptions, especially for p = 3, groups with a quadratic pair for the prime p tend to be more or less groups of Lie type in characteristic p.

See also

p-stable group

References

Finite groups